Aschau im Zillertal is a municipality in the Schwaz district in the Austrian state of Tyrol.

Geography
Aschau lies in a narrow neck of the Ziller valley on both sides of the river.

References

Cities and towns in Schwaz District